Ardito Bresciani (25 June 1899 – 17 June 1948) was an Italian cyclist. He competed in two events at the 1924 Summer Olympics. He also won stage 11 of the 1927 Giro d'Italia.

References

External links
 

1899 births
1948 deaths
Italian male cyclists
Italian Giro d'Italia stage winners
Olympic cyclists of Italy
Cyclists at the 1924 Summer Olympics
Sportspeople from Verona
Cyclists from the Province of Verona